Ionuţ Daniel Dragomir (born 4 July 1974) is a Romanian former footballer who played as a full back. Dragomir grew up at Steaua București football academy and made his Liga I debut 15 August 1999 for FC U Craiova, in a 1–2 defeat against Dinamo București. In his career Dragomir played only for Romanian clubs, among them: FC U Craiova, Petrolul Ploieşti, UTA Arad, Oțelul Galați or Pandurii Târgu Jiu. He retired in 2009 after a last season played at Minerul Lupeni.

External links
 
 

1974 births
Living people
Footballers from Bucharest
Romanian footballers
Association football defenders
Liga I players
Liga II players
FC Steaua București players
FC U Craiova 1948 players
FC Petrolul Ploiești players
FC UTA Arad players
ASC Oțelul Galați players
CS Pandurii Târgu Jiu players
CS Inter Gaz București players
CS Minerul Lupeni players